Serine/threonine protein kinase MST4, also known as mammalian STE20-like protein kinase 4 (MST-4), is a protein that in humans is encoded by the MST4 gene.

Function 

The product of this gene is a member of the GCK group III family of kinases, which are a subset of the Ste20-like kinases. The encoded protein contains an amino-terminal kinase domain, and a carboxy-terminal regulatory domain that mediates homodimerization. The protein kinase localizes to the Golgi apparatus and is specifically activated by binding to the Golgi matrix protein GM130. It is also cleaved by caspase-3 in vitro, and may function in the apoptotic pathway. Several alternatively spliced transcript variants of this gene have been described, but the full-length nature of some of these variants has not been determined.

Interactions 

RP6-213H19.1 has been shown to interact with:
 CTTNBP2NL, 
 CTTNBP2, 
 FAM40A,
 MOBKL3, 
 PDCD10, 
 STRN3,  and
 STRN.

References

Further reading